Olivier Rouyer (born 1 December 1955) is a retired football striker from France. He earned seventeen international caps (two goals) for the France national team during the late 1970s and early 1980s. A player of AS Nancy, he was a member of the France national football team in the 1978 FIFA World Cup. He coached Nancy from 1991-94.

Personal life
Rouyer is gay, coming out after retiring as a player and coach.

Honours
Nancy
Coupe de France: 1977–78

See also
 List of LGBT Olympians

References

 French Football Federation Profile 

1955 births
Living people
1978 FIFA World Cup players
AS Nancy Lorraine managers
AS Nancy Lorraine players
Association football forwards
FC Sion managers
Footballers at the 1976 Summer Olympics
France international footballers
French football managers
French footballers
French LGBT sportspeople
Ligue 1 players
Olympic footballers of France
Olympique Lyonnais players
Sportspeople from Nancy, France
RC Strasbourg Alsace players
Gay sportsmen
LGBT association football players
French expatriate sportspeople in Switzerland
Expatriate football managers in Switzerland
Mediterranean Games silver medalists for France
Mediterranean Games medalists in football
Competitors at the 1975 Mediterranean Games
Footballers from Grand Est